Dichomeris stasimopa is a moth in the family Gelechiidae. It was described by Edward Meyrick in 1937. It is found in South Africa.

The wingspan is 12–13 mm. The forewings are bronzy grey. The stigmata are dark grey, the plical slightly before the first discal. There is an obscure grey-whitish direct transverse line about three-fourths, straight or slightly irregular. The hindwings are grey.

References

Endemic moths of South Africa
Moths described in 1937
stasimopa